Radio Pljevlja is an FM radio station in Montenegro. Its headquarters are in Pljevlja.

References

Radio stations in Montenegro